Martin Donald Van Oosterhout (October 10, 1900 – January 28, 1979) was a legislator and state court judge in northwestern Iowa, and a United States circuit judge of the United States Court of Appeals for the Eighth Circuit.

Education and career

Born in Orange City, Iowa, Van Oosterhout received a Bachelor of Arts degree from the University of Iowa in 1922, and a Juris Doctor from the University of Iowa College of Law in 1924. He was in private practice in Orange City from 1924 to 1933. In the last four of those years (from 1929 to 1933) he also served as a Republican member of the Iowa House of Representatives. He was a Judge of the 21st Judicial District of Iowa from 1933 to 1954.

Federal judicial service

On August 16, 1954, Van Oosterhout was nominated by President Dwight D. Eisenhower to a seat on the United States Court of Appeals for the Eighth Circuit vacated when a fellow Iowan, Judge Seth Thomas, assumed senior status. He was confirmed by the United States Senate on August 20, 1954, and received his commission on August 26, 1954. He served as Chief Judge and member of the Judicial Conference of the United States from 1968 to 1970. He assumed senior status on July 6, 1971. He was a Judge of the Temporary Emergency Court of Appeals from 1972 to 1977. He served in senior status until his death on January 28, 1979.

Personal life
Van Oosterhout's parents were Peter and Sarah. He was married to Ethel Greenway, with whom he had one son, Peter Denne.

References

Sources
 

1900 births
1979 deaths
Iowa state court judges
Members of the Iowa House of Representatives
Judges of the United States Court of Appeals for the Eighth Circuit
United States court of appeals judges appointed by Dwight D. Eisenhower
20th-century American judges
University of Iowa alumni
University of Iowa College of Law alumni
People from Orange City, Iowa
Place of death missing
20th-century American politicians